Clear Point is a headland forming the northeast side of the entrance to Leith Harbour, Stromness Bay, on the north coast of South Georgia. The name appears to be first used on a 1929 British Admiralty chart.

References
 

Headlands of South Georgia and the South Sandwich Islands